Yāska was an ancient Indian grammarian and linguist [est. 7th–5th century BCE(disputed)]. Preceding Pāṇini [est. 7th–4th century BCE(disputed)], he is traditionally identified as the author of Nirukta, the discipline of "etymology" (explanation of words) within Sanskrit grammatical tradition and the Nighantu, the oldest proto-thesaurus in India. Yaska is widely regarded as the precursive founder of the discipline of what would become etymology in both the East and the West. "यास्काचार्यो  यस्कस्य अपत्यं स्यात्" The name Yaaska is probably a patronymic name meaning of Yaska यस्क. It is uncertain however who Yaska यस्क could have been."अपि पाणिनीयदृश्यते" The patronymic of Yaska is also seen in Panini's great work: The Astadhyayi (See Kashika commentary on  Sutra फक्फिञोरन्यतरस्याम्).  The list of Brihadaranyaka Upanishad, regarding, vamshas, says that Yaska could be a teacher of Bharadwaj भरद्वाज or a contemporary of him.

Dating
Pāṇini cites at least ten grammarians and linguists before him. According to Sumitra Mangesh Katre, the ten Vedic scholar names he quotes are of Apisali, Kashyapa, Gargya, Galava, Cakravarmana, Bharadvaja, Sakatayana, Sakalya, Senaka and Sphotayana.

Determining the exact century of Yaska is difficult, and opinions of different scholars vary from 7th–5th century BC. Pāṇini mentions Yaska as one of the previous linguists, and so Yaska must precede Pāṇini.

Contribution
Yaska is the author of the Nirukta, a technical treatise on etymology, lexical category and the semantics of Sanskrit words. He is thought to have succeeded , an old grammarian and expositor of the Vedas, who is mentioned in his text.

The Nirukta attempts to explain how certain words get to have their meanings, especially in the context of interpreting the Vedic texts. It includes a system of rules for forming words from roots and affixes, and a glossary of irregular words, and formed the basis for later lexicons and dictionaries. It consists of three parts, viz.: (i) Naighantuka, a collection of synonyms; (ii) Naigama, a collection of words peculiar to the Vedas, and (iii) Daivata, words relating to deities and sacrifices.

Nirukta, or etymology was one of the six vedangas or compulsory subjects in the syllabus of Vedic  scholarship in ancient India.

Lexical categories and parts of speech
Yāska defines four main categories of words: 
 nāma – nouns or substantives
 ākhyāta – verbs
 upasarga – pre-verbs or prefixes
 nipāta – particles, invariant words (perhaps prepositions)

Yāska singled out two main ontological categories: a process or an action (bhāva), and an entity or a being or a thing (sattva). Then he first defined the verb as that in which the bhāva ('process') is predominant whereas a noun is that in which the sattva ('thing') is predominant. The 'process' is one that has, according to one interpretation, an early stage and a later stage and when such a 'process' is the dominant sense, a finite verb is used as in vrajati, 'walks', or pacati, 'cooks'.

But this characterisation of noun / verb is inadequate, as some processes may also have nominal forms. For e.g., He went for a walk. Hence, Yāska proposed that when a process is referred to as a 'petrified' or 'configured' mass (mūrta) extending from start to finish, a verbal noun should be used, e.g. vrajyā, a walk, or pakti, a cooking. The latter may be viewed as a case of summary scanning,
since the element of sequence in the process is lacking.

These concepts are related to modern notions of grammatical aspect, the mūrta constituting the perfective and the bhāva the imperfective aspect.

Yāska also gives a test for nouns both concrete and abstract: nouns are words which can be indicated by the pronoun that.

Words as carriers of meaning: atomism vs. holism debate
As in modern semantic theory, Yāska views words as the main carriers of meaning. This view – that words have a primary or preferred ontological status in defining meaning, was fiercely debated in the Indian tradition over many centuries. The two sides of the debate may be called the Nairuktas (based on Yāska's Nirukta, atomists), vs the Vaiyākarans (grammarians following Pāṇini, holists), and the debate continued in various forms for twelve centuries involving different philosophers from the Nyaya, Mimamsa and Buddhist schools.

In the prātishākhya texts that precede Yāska, and possibly Sakatayana as well, the gist of the controversy was stated cryptically in sutra form as "saṃhitā pada-prakṛtiḥ". According to the atomist view, the words would be the primary elements (prakṛti) out of which the sentence is constructed, while the holistic view considers the sentence as the primary entity, originally given in its context of utterance, and the words are arrived at only through analysis and abstraction.

This debate relates to the atomistic vs holistic interpretation of linguistic fragments – a very similar debate is raging today between traditional semantics and cognitive linguistics, over the view whether words in themselves have semantic interpretations that can be composed to form larger strings.  The cognitive linguistics view of semantics is that any definition of a word ultimately constrains its meanings because the actual meaning of a word can only be construed by considering a large number of individual contextual cues.

Etymologically, nouns originate from verbs
Yāska also defends the view, presented first in the lost text of Sakatayana that etymologically, most nouns have their origins in verbs. An example in English may be the noun origin, derived from the Latin originalis, which is ultimately based on the verb oriri, "to rise". This view is related to the position that in defining agent categories, behaviours are ontologically primary to, say, appearance. This was also a source for considerable debate for several centuries (see Sakatayana for details).

References

Sources

.

 
 

 

 Kahrs, Eivind. On the Study of Yāska's Nirukta. Bhandarkar Oriental Research Institute, Pune, India, 2005. LCCN 2006310275. .

 Langacker, Ronald W. Grammar and Conceptualization. Mouton de Gruyer, 1999. .
 
 

 Matilal, Bimal Krishna. The word and the world: India's contribution to the study of language. Oxford, 1990. .
 

Rajavade, V.K. Yāska's Nirukta. Government Oriental Series Class A, no.7. Bhandarkar Oriental Research Institute, Pune, India, 1993. .

 
Sharma, T.R.S. Chief editor. Ancient Indian Literature, An Anthology. Volume 1, Sahitya Akademi, New Delhi, 2000. .

External links
"Nirukta" at the Encyclopædia Britannica
Niruktam sememes
Yaska’s Nirukta and his reflections on language

Ancient Sanskrit grammarians
Atomists
Indian Sanskrit scholars